Fear, Inc. is a 2016 American comedy horror film directed by Vincent Masciale and written by Luke Barnett. The film stars Lucas Neff, Caitlin Stasey, Chris Marquette and Stephanie Drake.

Plot 

A young woman, Jennifer Adams, is seemingly chased by an attacker in a parking garage. She grabs her phone and attempts to end the attack by insisting that "it" wasn't part of the plan. The person on the other end of the line puts her on hold. Jennifer then spots the man robed and masked approaching her with a nail studded baseball bat. As she rushes to an elevator to escape, the attacker disappears. Jennifer walks to her car, assuming the chase is over. She is then stopped by a weird security guard telling her that if she finds anything creepy, do not hesitate to give him a call. She hops inside her car only to discover that several people are locating her through her radio. A man pops up from the back seat and strangles her to death.

Horror movie buff Joe, along with his girlfriend Lindsey, goes to a haunted maze as part of their weekly date. Joe comments that the attraction isn't scary enough. They are then spooked by a random guy who gives Joe a calling card for a company called "Fear, Inc." where they bring fears to life. Joe takes interest in this and takes the card. On the way home, Joe realizes he lost his wallet and phone and concludes the man from earlier stole it. Morning comes and Joe's best friend Ben and his wife Ashleigh arrive at their house for a Halloween party. Joe tells Ben and Ashleigh about the calling card but Ben warns him not to take part of it as someone he knew got seriously hurt because of it. After the night, Joe finds his wallet and phone back in his room with the calling card placed on top of it. Out of curiosity, he calls "Fear, Inc." only to be informed that their service has sold out. The next morning, while Ashleigh, Ben and Lindsey are hanging around the pool, Joe's neighbor Bill warns him about spotting an intruder in Joe's home. Joe dismisses his warning only to be attacked by a seemingly crazy person. The police arrive and Lindsey and the others confirm that they saw no one in the house. After a night of partying, the group arrive back in the house and the television mysteriously turns on showing the news channel. The reporter seems to be reporting in front of Joe's house and informing them that Bill, Ashleigh, Ben and Lindsey were killed by a suspect named Joe Foster. Ben looks outside only to see no reporter out there. The three scolded Joe for pulling up yet another prank. Joe admits to the three that he called "Fear, Inc." the other night.

Before Ben can scold him, the lights go out. Joe begs the others to just go with it. He volunteers himself to check the breaker outside, only for his attention to be caught by Bill, who comes running outside his home. Bill warns Joe about yet another intruder only to be stabbed by a cloaked and masked man (in the same manner as Drew Barrymore's character from Scream"). Thinking Bill was in on the prank, Joe returns inside and tells the others what happened. They attempt to escape only to find out that Joe's only car has been damaged. Thinking it is going way too far, Lindsey insists that Joe call the cops. Successful, they decide to lock all the doors and windows until all the cops get to the house. While on the run, Ashleigh gets separated from the group. Ben goes out to find her while Lindsey and Joe break bottles for weapons. Still convinced everything is a prank, Joe and a reluctant Lindsey go outside to continue to play with it. They find Ashleigh pinned to a tree with arrows (to which Joe recognized as a scene from Friday the 13th). Joe, amazed at what he thinks is a great prosthetic, is warned by a barely alive Ashleigh to run back inside as a cloaked and masked man approaches them. Lindsey and Joe return inside the house but another masked man knocks Joe unconscious. He wakes up to find Ben gagged and strapped to a chair next to a table filled with cutting contraptions. The TV turns on and a cloaked man instructs Joe to cut Ben's left hand off or Lindsey (who is then shown through the TV tied to a bed with an armed man next to her) will die. Joe realizes he was still being pranked as he references his situation in the Saw films. He arbitrarily cuts off Ben's left arm and Lindsey is spared from an attack. Thinking the special effects were cool enough, Joe continues to follow instructions from the man. He is then tasked to rip open Ben's chest to retrieve a key. As he does, Joe notices Ben is unconscious and seemingly dead. He also discovers real blood is pouring out of his body. Joe realizes he killed Ben and screams in terror. The lights turn off and after several seconds, Ben's body disappeared. Joe hears Lindsey's screams and rushes to help her. He arrives in the room only to find Lindsey unconscious but alive. He grabs his phone and successfully calls the cops once more as the ones he called earlier were not there yet. While calling, he is attacked by a masked man but Joe is able to defend himself. Joe strangles and kills the man. As he grabs his phone once more to notify the emergency operator, Lindsey suddenly wakes up and unties herself from the bed. She tells Joe to hang up the phone. Confused, Joe asks Lindsey what is going on. Lindsey explains that everything is a prank and that Ashleigh and Ben are alive and well, which is proven when they enter the house picking out their prosthetic.

Lindsey and Joe tell them that the man was actually killed. Ben and Ashleigh freak out when they explained that "Fear, Inc." is actually a very dangerous company and when they found out that one of their men was killed, they will be coming for the rest of them. Ben and Ashleigh flee, leaving Joe and Lindsey to deal with it. Lindsey explains that Joe's phone was reprogrammed by the company so that every time he makes an emergency call, it redirects to "Fear, Inc." Lindsey insists they bury the body in the desert. They steal the "Fear, Inc." van but on the way, they are stopped by the sheriff only for him to be hit by a stray van (as in Final Destination). They escape and proceed to bury the body. Suddenly, another van comes and "Fear, Inc." leader Abe, along with his cronies, threaten Joe and Lindsey who are hiding among the bushes. Joe and Lindsey are captured and Abe tells Joe that he killed Tom without knowing he has a wife and a daughter. Joe explains that he didn't mean it. Suddenly, Joe's face is covered with a cloth and his hands were tied. He is left behind in the desert while Lindsey is taken away and killed. Joe gets out of his bindings and walks to a seemingly abandoned diner. He is let in by a man and allowed to use the phone. Joe calls 911 again only for it to be answered by Lindsey, who is sitting on the other side of the empty diner. Relieved at seeing an alive and well Lindsey, he rushes to hug her. Lindsey then explains that it was all part of the package and that Ben and Ashleigh were in on it the entire time. Abe and his cronies arrive at the diner along with Ben, Ashleigh and Tom and they celebrate Joe for overcoming the horror. While drinking, Ben admits to Joe that "Fear, Inc." is dangerous for real and is thankful that nobody got hurt as Abe's cronies began to surround the four. Joe realizes he knows the scene from somewhere. Abe quotes a line from the movie Cobra saying, "You're the disease, I am the cure." Suddenly, they snap Ben's neck, shoot Ashleigh in the head with a gun and slash Lindsey's throat. Before Abe kills Joe, he explains he can't let him leave without experiencing his all-time favorite death scenes from films. He holds a knife to Joe's throat and says "Cut to black bitch!"

The film ends with a phone ringing and Judson, "Fear, Inc.'s" phone operator answers the phone by saying their service is sold out. He then tells the rest of "Fear, Inc." that they've got another customer.

Cast

Production 
The film is directed by Vincent Masciale based on the script by Luke Barnett, both are also producing the film along with Heather Kasprzak and Natalie Masciale. Principal photography on the film began in early August 2015 in Los Angeles.

Reception 
Variety wrote: "The main thing early reels have going for them isn’t any actual cleverness or wit, but Neff’s pleasant riffing within a stock slacker-bro role. When his character stops having fun, so does the audience." On Rotten Tomatoes, the film has an approval rating of 46%, based on reviews from 13 critics.

References

External links 
 

2016 films
Films shot in Los Angeles
American comedy horror films
2016 comedy horror films
2016 directorial debut films
2010s English-language films
2010s American films
English-language comedy horror films